Braddock Reservoir is a protected reservoir near Swift Current, Saskatchewan, Canada.

See also
List of lakes of Saskatchewan

References

Lakes of Saskatchewan
Reservoirs in Canada